Lordship is a rural area and census town in County Louth, Ireland. It is located in the civil parish of Ballymascanlan. 

The local Roman Catholic church, the Church of St Mary, was built  and is in the parish of Lordship & Ballymascanlon of the Roman Catholic Archdiocese of Armagh. The local Gaelic Athletic Association club is St. Patricks GFC. Founded in 1953, the club has won the Louth Senior Football Championship on several occasions.

Lordship was designated as a census town by the Central Statistics Office for the first time in the 2016 census, at which time it had a population of 486 people.

See also
 Lordship Credit Union

References

Towns and villages in County Louth